Apasionada is a Mexican telenovela produced by Televisa for Telesistema Mexicano in 1964.

Cast 
 
Carmen Montejo
Anita Blanch
Yolanda Ciani

References

External links 

Mexican telenovelas
1964 telenovelas
Televisa telenovelas
1964 Mexican television series debuts
1964 Mexican television series endings
Spanish-language telenovelas